Andrew McMillan may refer to:

 Andrew McMillan (swimmer) (born 1985), New Zealand swimmer
 Andrew McMillan (writer) (1957–2012), Australian writer, music journalist and musician
 Andrew McMillan (poet) (born 1988), English poet

See also
Andrew McMillen (born  1988), Australian journalist